Omid William Scobie (born July 1981) is a British journalist and writer best known for co-authoring the book Finding Freedom. Scobie's work focuses on the Duchess of Sussex.

Early life and education

Scobie was born in Wales in July 1981 and grew up in Oxford with his younger brother and parents, an Iranian social worker mother and a British marketing director father. He attended Magdalen College School and then entered the sixth form at Cherwell School in Oxford. He studied journalism at the London College of Communication.

Career

After a brief stint on a British celebrity magazine, Scobie became the European bureau chief on the American celebrity and entertainment magazine Us Weekly, where he stayed for a decade. Part of his role was reporting on royals. He became royal editor-at-large at Harper's Bazaar and the royal contributor at ABC News, appearing regularly on Good Morning America and hosting the network's royal podcast, the HeirPod.

In 2020, Scobie co-authored a book about Prince Harry, Duke of Sussex, and Meghan, Duchess of Sussex, with American journalist Carolyn Durand. Finding Freedom: Harry and Meghan and the Making of A Modern Royal Family was published in August 2020 by HarperCollins. Within five days it had sold more than 31,000 copies in the United Kingdom and had secured the number one spot for hardback non-fiction on The Sunday Times bestseller list. In August 2021 a paperback edition of the book was released with a new epilogue covering events of the previous year, including Meghan and Harry's TV interview with Oprah Winfrey.

Personal life

As of 2021, Scobie was living in East London with his French bulldog.

Bibliography
 Finding Freedom: Harry and Meghan and the Making of a Modern Royal Family (2020) 
 Endgame: Inside the Royal Family and the Monarchy's Fight for Survival (2023)

References

External links

1981 births
Living people
21st-century biographers
Welsh biographers
Welsh male journalists
Celebrity biographers
Date of birth missing (living people)
Male biographers
21st-century British journalists
Welsh people of Iranian descent
Alumni of Magdalen College, Oxford
Alumni of the London College of Communication
21st-century Welsh writers